Blue flag or Blue Flag may refer to:
Sport and recreation
Blue Flag beach, a beach or marina that meets certain quality standards
Blue Flag, the flag of Chelsea F.C.
Blue flag, a particular Flag#Swimming flags
Blue flag, a particular Racing flags#Blue flag
Botany 
Transport
Blue flag, a particular Flag#Railway flags in railway use.
Blue sign used by European waterways vessels passing on the starboard side
Military
Blue Flag (Israeli Air Force exercise), the name of an Israeli Air Force exercise
Blue Flag (United States Air Force exercise), the name of a United States Air Force command and control exercise
Other
Blue Flag (manga), a manga series by KAITO.
"The Blue Flag",  World War I song composed by Carrie Jacobs-Bond
Blue Flag, common representation of the street gang Crips

See also
Bonnie Blue Flag